Harris Institute for the Arts, also known as Harris Institute of Music, is a post-secondary institute of higher education located in Toronto, Canada. It was founded by John Harris in 1989.

History 
The institute was founded by John Harris in 1989 in order to strengthen the music industry of Canada.

Programs 
 Audio-production program
 Arts-management program

References

External link 
 Harris Institute of Music

Music schools in Canada